Armedlu-ye Sofla (also known as Ārmatlū and Ārmedlū-ye Qadīm) is a village in Vargahan Rural District, in the Central District of Ahar County, East Azerbaijan Province, Iran. At the 2006 census, its population was 22, in 4 families.

References 

Populated places in Ahar County